Marie-Louise Perrenoud (born 6 July 1947) is a French speed skater. She competed in four events at the 1968 Winter Olympics.

References

External links
 

1947 births
Living people
French female speed skaters
Olympic speed skaters of France
Speed skaters at the 1968 Winter Olympics
Sportspeople from Prague